McDuffie County is a county located in the U.S. state of Georgia. As of the 2020 census, the population was 21,632. The county seat is Thomson. The county was created on October 18, 1870 and named after the South Carolina governor and senator George McDuffie.

McDuffie County is part of the Augusta-Richmond County, GA-SC Metropolitan Statistical Area.

History
Most communities located in the county were founded before the county was created. Some have faded into obscurity. The Historic Wrightsborough Foundation preserves the memory of the early 12,000 acre settlement of Wrightborough, which was occupied 1768 to 1920.

Geography

Most of the southern half of McDuffie County, south of Thomson, is located in the Brier Creek sub-basin of the Savannah River basin, except for a slice of the eastern portion of the county, north of Dearing and along a north–south line running through Boneville, which is located in the Middle Savannah River sub-basin of the Savannah River basin. The northern half of McDuffie County, north of Thomson, is located in the Little River sub-basin of the same Savannah River basin.

Major highways

  Interstate 20
  U.S. Route 78
  U.S. Route 221
  U.S. Route 278
  State Route 10
  State Route 12
  State Route 17
  State Route 43
  State Route 47
  State Route 150
  State Route 223
  State Route 402 (unsigned designation for I-20)

Adjacent counties
 Lincoln County (northeast)
 Columbia County (east)
 Richmond County (southeast)
 Jefferson County (south)
 Warren County (west)
 Wilkes County (northwest)

Demographics

2000 census
As of the census of 2000, there were 21,231 people, 7,970 households, and 5,857 families living in the county.  The population density was 32/km2 (82/mi2).  There were 8,916 housing units at an average density of 13/km2 (34/mi2).  The racial makeup of the county was 60.8% White, 37.5% Black or African American, 0.9% Native American, 0.2% Asian, 0.03% Pacific Islander, 0.3% from other races, and 0.8% from two or more races.  1.3% of the population were Hispanic or Latino of any race.

There were 7,970 households, out of which 36.30% had children under the age of 18 living with them, 49.70% were married couples living together, 19.20% had a female householder with no husband present, and 26.50% were non-families. 23.20% of all households were made up of individuals, and 9.40% had someone living alone who was 65 years of age or older.  The average household size was 2.62 and the average family size was 3.08.

In the county, the population was spread out, with 27.90% under the age of 18, 8.60% from 18 to 24, 28.40% from 25 to 44, 23.20% from 45 to 64, and 11.90% who were 65 years of age or older.  The median age was 35 years. For every 100 females, there were 89.40 males.  For every 100 females age 18 and over, there were 84.50 males.

The median income for a household in the county was $31,920, and the median income for a family was $38,235. Males had a median income of $30,147 versus $20,499 for females. The per capita income for the county was $18,005.  About 14.10% of families and 18.40% of the population were below the poverty line, including 26.00% of those under age 18 and 20.00% of those age 65 or over.

2010 census
As of the 2010 United States Census, there were 21,875 people, 8,289 households, and 5,964 families living in the county. The racial makeup of the county was 57.2% white, 39.8% black or African American, 0.3% Asian, 0.3% American Indian, 0.1% Pacific islander, 0.9% from other races, and 1.4% from two or more races. Those of Hispanic or Latino origin made up 2.2% of the population. In terms of ancestry, 18.4% were American, 8.3% were English, 6.0% were Irish, and 5.4% were German.

Of the 8,289 households, 36.7% had children under the age of 18 living with them, 45.0% were married couples living together, 21.4% had a female householder with no husband present, 28.0% were non-families, and 24.2% of all households were made up of individuals. The average household size was 2.60 and the average family size was 3.07. The median age was 38.4 years.

The median income for a household in the county was $35,414 and the median income for a family was $42,472. Males had a median income of $34,300 versus $22,710 for females. The per capita income for the county was $17,261. About 16.0% of families and 19.5% of the population were below the poverty line, including 27.2% of those under age 18 and 20.1% of those age 65 or over.

2020 census

As of the 2020 United States census, there were 21,632 people, 8,153 households, and 5,770 families residing in the county.

Education

Communities

City
 Thomson (county seat)

Town
 Dearing

Unincorporated communities
 Autney
 Boneville
 Cobbham

Politics
Typical of many counties in Georgia and the Solid South, McDuffie County mainly backed candidates of the Democratic Party in presidential elections by wide margins prior to 1964. There were several exceptions to this, firstly between 1892 and 1908 when it supported Republican William McKinley and the Populist candidacies of James B. Weaver and favorite son Thomas E. Watson.

See also

 Central Savannah River Area
 National Register of Historic Places listings in McDuffie County, Georgia
List of counties in Georgia

References

External links
 Official website

 
Georgia (U.S. state) counties
1870 establishments in Georgia (U.S. state)
Augusta metropolitan area
Populated places established in 1870